Kord Qeshlaq (also Romanized as Kord Qeshlāq; also known as Gord Qeshlāq, Kord Qeshlāqī, and Kurd-Kishlak) is a village in Qareh Poshtelu-e Bala Rural District, Qareh Poshtelu District, Zanjan County, Zanjan Province, Iran. At the 2006 census, its population was 50, in 9 families.

References 

Populated places in Zanjan County